A list of films produced in Brazil in 2007 (see 2007 in film):

2007

See also
2007 in Brazil
2007 in Brazilian television
List of 2007 box office number-one films in Brazil

2007
Films
Brazilian